Clematis pauciflora is a species of clematis known by the common name ropevine. This flowering plant is native to the high desert and chaparral slopes of southern California and Baja California. It is a woody vine with nodes every few centimeters which produce leaves and flowers. The leaves are made up of several dark green lobed leaflets, each one to three centimeters wide. From each leaf-bearing node grows an inflorescence of one to three flowers with narrow petallike sepals in shades of light yellow. Most of the flower is made up of a spray of up to 50 stamens and almost as many similar-looking pistils. The fruit is an achene equipped with a long plume-like style.
The specific epithet pauciflora is Latin for 'few-flowered'.

References

External links
Jepson Manual Treatment
USDA Plants Profile
Photo gallery

pauciflora
Flora of California
Flora of Baja California